Margaret Mukoya  (born ) is a retired Kenyan female volleyball player, who played as a middle blocker.

She was part of the Kenya women's national volleyball team at the 2002 FIVB Volleyball Women's World Championship in Germany. On club level she played with Telkom Kenya.

Clubs
 Telkom Kenya (2002)

References

1973 births
Living people
Kenyan women's volleyball players
Place of birth missing (living people)